Bruce Coburn or Cockburn may refer to:

 Bruce Cockburn (pronounced Coburn), Canadian musician
Bruce Cockburn (album)
Bruce Coburn, character in 40 Guns to Apache Pass